Hell on Earth is a 1931 German anti-war film directed by Victor Trivas. In France, The film is also known as No Man's Land.

Plot summary
The film is mainly set in a dugout, formed from a basement, in the no man's land between the trenches and front lines during the First World War.

A ruined house is entered by a soldier stranded between the lines who then discovers an injured man trapped beneath a heavy beam in the basement. The man has no uniform and is rescued by him and another man who we finally realise are on different sides. The injured man cannot speak and is helped out by the other two. They try to leave and return to their own lines but are fired upon by both sides and so return to the safety of the basement.

More soldiers find the safe haven in between all the firing and death, with the credits listing the characters as The Englishman, The Frenchman, The Russian Jew, The Vaudevillian and The German. The storyline follows arguments and discussions between them and ends with them marching out together with a final commentary declaring the sentiment of peace
"Marching forward. Defying their common enemy - WAR."

Cast

Soundtrack
Ernst Busch's version of "Der heimliche Aufmarsch" (The Secret Deployment) by Erich Weinert (poem) and Hanns Eisler (music) is played at the end of the film.

References

External links

1931 films
1931 war films
Films of the Weimar Republic
German war films
German black-and-white films
1930s German-language films
1930s French-language films
Yiddish-language films
Western Front (World War I) films
Anti-war films about World War I
1930s English-language films
English-language German films
1931 multilingual films
German multilingual films
1930s German films